Pemberwick is a neighborhood/section and census-designated place in Greenwich in Fairfield County, Connecticut, United States. As of the 2010 census it had a population of 3,680.

Geography
The town of Greenwich is one political and taxing body, but consists of several distinct sections or neighborhoods, such as Banksville, Byram, Cos Cob, Glenville, Mianus, Old Greenwich, Riverside and Greenwich (sometimes referred to as central, or downtown, Greenwich). Of these neighborhoods, three (Cos Cob, Old Greenwich, and Riverside) have separate postal names and ZIP codes. The Pemberwick neighborhood is on the west side of Greenwich, bordered to the north by Glenville, to the east by central Greenwich, to the south by Byram, and to the west by Port Chester, New York. U.S. Route 1 (West Putnam Avenue) forms the southern edge of Pemberwick. The Byram River flows from north to south through the community.

References 

Neighborhoods in Connecticut
Greenwich, Connecticut
Census-designated places in Fairfield County, Connecticut
Census-designated places in Connecticut
Populated coastal places in Connecticut